Harvey Clifford (18 September 1926 – 13 January 1982) was a Canadian alpine skier. He competed in three events at the 1948 Winter Olympics. He was inducted into the Ottawa Sport Hall of Fame.

Clifford skiing on Aoraki / Mount Cook, was in the  Academy Award nominated for Short Subject (Live Action) film Snows of Aorangi.

References

1926 births
1982 deaths
Alpine skiers at the 1948 Winter Olympics
Canadian male alpine skiers
Olympic alpine skiers of Canada
Sportspeople from Manitoba